The white-flanked antwren (Myrmotherula axillaris) is an insectivorous bird in the antbird family, Thamnophilidae.

Taxonomy
The white-flanked antwren was described by the French ornithologist Louis Vieillot in 1817 and given the binomial name Myrmothera axillaris. The silvery-flanked antwren (Myrmotherula luctuosa) was previously treated as conspecific.

Description
The adult male has dark grey upperparts, black underparts, and black wings with bars of white spots. The flanks and underwings are white. The female and immature male have brown upperparts, yellowish-buff underparts and weakly barred rufous wings. Her flanks and underwings are white, much like the male.

Males of the distinctive western race M. a. melaena have black upperparts and underparts, and the female is darker than nominate M. a. axillaris.

Distribution and habitat
The white-flanked antwren is a resident breeder in tropical Central and South America from El Salvador and Honduras south to Amazonian Bolivia and southern Brazil, and on Trinidad. The white-flanked antwren is found throughout the entire Amazon Basin as well as to the southeast in the adjacent Tocantins-Araguaia River drainage, and then in disjunct groups on the southeast coast of Brazil; it also ranges through the Guyanas on the northeast of South America to Pacific and Caribbean coastal regions of Ecuador, Colombia, and Venezuela; also, the entire eastern Venezuela Orinoco River grouping is part of the northern Amazon range. The northern Andes cordillera bifurcates the Central American and coastal groups of the northwest from the Amazonian range.

Behaviour
This is a common and confiding bird of primary and second growth forest, usually found in small groups. The female lays two purple-marked white eggs, which are incubated by both sexes for 16 days to hatching, in a small plant fibre and dead leaf cup nest low in a tree or shrub.
 
The white-flanked antwren feeds on small insects and other arthropods taken from twigs and foliage in the lower branches of trees. It has a queep whistle followed by a trilled trrrrrr. M. a. melaena has a two note call, naa-who and a whistled descending pee pee pee-pee-pee-pee-pee-puu-puu call. Given the differences in plumage and vocalisations, the two forms may possibly be different species.

References

Further reading

External links

White-flanked antwren videos on the Internet Bird Collection
Stamps (for Nicaragua) with RangeMap
White-flanked antwren photo gallery VIREO
White-flanked antwren Photo; Article www.ib.usp.br

white-flanked antwren
Birds of Central America
Birds of the Amazon Basin
Birds of the Guianas
Birds of Colombia
Birds of Venezuela
Birds of Ecuador
Birds of Bolivia
Birds of Trinidad and Tobago
white-flanked antwren
white-flanked antwren